George and Christina Ealy House is a house in New Albany, Ohio, in Franklin County, Ohio northeast of Columbus, which is listed on the U.S. National Register of Historic Places (NRHP).  The listing includes Resch Park.  It was listed on the NRHP in 2008.  

The Ealy's operated a sawmill and prospered.  George Ealy built (or arranged to have built) this house in brick, and "recorded the year of the house's construction, 1860, in his own hand in the attic. He also listed the names of the 'work hands' who built the house. They include, as masons, a father and son named Schott, and two Beecher brothers as master carpenters. The Schotts were a German family who moved from Columbus to Plain Township in 1850. The Beechers came from Connecticut
and settled in New Albany about the year the town was laid out, in 1837."

Ownership of the house was obtained by the New Albany-Plain Township Historical Society in 2004. The house is often still used for events like Art Shows.

It has a side-gabled slate roof and stands on a foundation of quarried sand and limestone.

References

		
National Register of Historic Places in Franklin County, Ohio
Houses completed in 1860